Dashti Kalateh or Dashti Kola or Dasht Kalateh may refer to:
 Dashti Kalateh-ye Gharbi
 Dashti Kalateh-ye Sharqi